The phrase "carrot and stick" is a metaphor for the use of a combination of reward and punishment to induce a desired behaviour.

In politics, "carrot or stick" sometimes refers to the realist concept of soft and hard power. The carrot in this context could be the promise of economic or diplomatic aid between nations, while the stick might be the threat of military action.

Origin 
The earliest English-language references to the "carrot and stick" come from authors in the mid-19th century who in turn wrote in reference to a caricature or cartoon of the time that depicted a race between donkey riders, with the losing jockey using the strategy of beating his steed with "blackthorn twigs" to urge it forward, while the winner of the race sits in his saddle relaxing and holding the butt end of his baited stick. In fact, in some oral traditions, turnips were used instead of carrots as the donkey's temptation.

Decades later, the idea appeared in a letter from Winston Churchill, dated July 6, 1938: "Thus, by every device from the stick to the carrot, the emaciated Austrian donkey is made to pull the Nazi barrow up an ever-steepening hill."

The Southern Hemisphere caught up in 1947 and 1948 amid Australian newspaper commentary about the need to stimulate productivity following World War II.

The earliest uses of the idiom in widely available U.S. periodicals were in The Economist's December 11, 1948 issue and in a Daily Republic newspaper article that same year that discussed Russia's economy.

In the German language, as well as Russian and Ukrainian, a related idiom translates as sugar bread and whip.

See also

References

External links 

 EconPapers abstract for an experiment using this model "The Carrot or the Stick: Rewards, Punishments, and Cooperation"

19th-century neologisms
English phrases
English-language idioms
Metaphors referring to food and drink
Coercion
Carrot